According to the IB's "Find a World School" list, as of September 2022 there are over 5500 schools offering one or more IB programmes.
Notable examples include:

Africa

Eswatini (formerly,Swaziland)
Waterford Kamhlaba United World College of Southern Africa

Ethiopia
International Community School of Addis Ababa

Ghana
SOS-Hermann Gmeiner International College
Tema International School
Morgan International Community School

Kenya
International School of Kenya
St. Mary's School, Nairobi

Malawi
Bishop Mackenzie International School

Mauritius
Le Bocage International School

Mozambique
American International School of Mozambique

Senegal
International School of Dakar

South Africa
American International School of Johannesburg
Crawford College Sandton

Tanzania
International School of Tanganyika
United World College East Africa

Zambia
International School of Lusaka

Zimbabwe
Harare International School

Asia

Armenia
United World College Dilijan

Bangladesh
Aga Khan School, Dhaka
American International School of Dhaka
International School Dhaka

Brunei
Jerudong International School
International School Brunei

Cambodia
Northbridge International School Cambodia
International School of Phnom Penh

China
American International School of Guangzhou
British International School Shanghai
British School of Beijing
Canadian International School of Beijing
Dulwich College Shanghai
Guangdong Country Garden School
High School Attached to Northeast Normal University
International School of Beijing
International School of Dongguan
International School of Tianjin
Léman International School - Chengdu
Nanjing International School
Nord Anglia International School Shanghai Pudong
Qingdao Amerasia International School
Shanghai American School
Shanghai Community International School
Shanghai Singapore International School
Western Academy of Beijing
Yew Chung International School of Shanghai
Beijing World Youth Academy

Hong Kong
Chinese International School
Creative Secondary School
Diocesan Boys' School
Discovery College
German Swiss International School
Hong Kong Academy
Hong Kong International School
Independent Schools Foundation Academy
International College Hong Kong
Island School
King George V School, Hong Kong
Li Po Chun United World College
Po Leung Kuk Choi Kai Yau School
Renaissance College, Hong Kong
Sha Tin College
St. Paul's Co-educational College

India
American Embassy School, Delhi
American School of Bombay
The British School, New Delhi
Canadian International School (Bangalore)
Cathedral and John Connon School, Mumbai
Dhirubhai Ambani International School, Mumbai
Ebenezer International School Bangalore
Good Shepherd International School, Ooty
Greenwood High International School
The Heritage School, Kolkata
Indus International School, Bangalore
Indus International School, Pune
The International School Bangalore
Jamnabai Narsee School, Mumbai
KIIT International School, Bhubaneswar
Kodaikanal International School
Mahindra United World College of India
Oakridge International School, Hyderabad
Pathways School Gurgaon
Stonehill International School
Symbiosis International School, Pune
Trio World Academy, Bangalore
Victorious Kidss Educares, Pune

Indonesia
ACG School Jakarta
ACS Jakarta
AIS Indonesia
Bali International School
Bandung Independent School
Bina Tunas Bangsa School
British School Jakarta
Gandhi Memorial International School
Global Jaya International School
Jakarta Intercultural School
Medan Independent School
Sekolah Global Indo-Asia
Sinarmas World Academy
Singapore International School, Indonesia
Surabaya Intercultural School
Pelita Harapan School
Tunas Bangsa School
Yogyakarta International School

Iran
Mehr-e-Taban Academy
Tehran International School

Japan
K International School
Aoba-Japan International School
Canadian Academy
Horizon Japan International School
Nagoya International School
Osaka International School
St. Mary's International School
Tokyo International School
Yokohama International School
United World College ISAK Japan

Jordan
Jubilee School
Amman Baccalaureate School

Kuwait
American International School of Kuwait
Kuwait Bilingual School

Lebanon
International College, Beirut
Wellspring Learning Community

Malaysia
Fairview International School
International School of Kuala Lumpur
The International School of Penang (Uplands)
Kolej Mara Banting
Malay College Kuala Kangsar
Marlborough College Malaysia
Mont'Kiara International School
Taylor's College

Myanmar
International School Yangon

Nepal

Oman
American British Academy
The Sultan's School

Pakistan
International School of Islamabad
The International School, Karachi

Palestine
Ramallah Friends Schools

Philippines
The Beacon School
Brent International School
British School Manila
Cebu International School
German European School Manila
International School Manila
Mahatma Gandhi International School
Saint Jude Catholic School
Singapore School Manila
Southville International School and Colleges
Xavier School

Qatar
ACS Doha
Doha British School

Saudi Arabia
British International School of Jeddah

Singapore

Anglo-Chinese School (Independent)
The British School, New Delhi
GEMS World Academy (Singapore)
St. Joseph's Institution
Tanglin Trust School
United World College of South East Asia

South Korea
Branksome Hall Asia
Chadwick International
Dulwich College Seoul
Gyeonggi Academy of Foreign Languages
Gyeonggi Suwon International School
Seoul Foreign School
 Taejon Christian International School

Syria
International School of Aleppo

Taiwan
I-Shou International School
Taipei American School
Taipei European School
Kaohsiung American School

Thailand
Bangkok Patana School, Bangkok
British International School, Phuket
International School Bangkok
KIS International School Bangkok
NIST International School
St Andrews International School Bangkok
Wells International School
United World College Thailand

United Arab Emirates
The British International School Abu Dhabi
Dubai International Academy
GEMS Modern Academy
Emirates International School
GEMS Wellington International School (Dubai)
GEMS World Academy
Jumeirah English Speaking School
Swiss International Scientific School in Dubai

Uzbekistan
Tashkent International School (TIS)

Vietnam
Australian International School, Vietnam
British International School Ho Chi Minh City
ISHCMC, Ho Chi Minh City
United Nations International School of Hanoi

Australasia

Australia
Albert Park College
Anglican Church Grammar School
Annesley Junior School
Australian International Academy
Blackwood High School
Cairns State High School
Canberra Grammar School
Canberra Girls Grammar School
Carey Baptist Grammar School
Concordia College (South Australia)
Copland College
Cranbrook School, Sydney
Elonera Montessori School
Fintona Girls' School
Firbank Girls' Grammar School
Frankston High School
Geelong Grammar School
German International School Sydney
Gilmore College
Glenunga International High School
Good Shepherd Lutheran College
Hunter Valley Grammar School
Immanuel College (Australia)
Indooroopilly State High School
International School of Western Australia
Ivanhoe Grammar School
John Paul College (Melbourne)
John Paul College (Brisbane)
John Wollaston Anglican Community School
Kambala School
Kardinia International College
Kingswood College Doncaster
Kingswood College (Box Hill)
Kormilda College
Loreto College, Victoria
Loreto College, Marryatville
Loreto College Coorparoo
Loreto Kirribilli
Loreto Normanhurst
Loreto Mandeville Hall
Lycée Condorcet (Sydney)
Mercedes College (Adelaide)
MLC School
Monte Sant' Angelo Mercy College
Moreton Bay Boys' College
Mount Scopus Memorial College
Mountain Creek State High School
Newington College
Oakleigh Grammar
Pembroke School, Adelaide
Presbyterian Ladies' College, Melbourne
Presbyterian Ladies' College, Perth
Preshil, The Margaret Lyttle Memorial School
Prince Alfred College
Queensland Academy for Science, Mathematics and Technology
Queensland Academy for Creative Industries
Queensland Academy for Health Sciences
Ravenswood School for Girls
SCECGS Redlands
Scotch College, Perth
Seymour College (Victoria)
Seymour College
Somerset College (Australia)
Southern Christian College
St Andrew's Cathedral School
St Brigid's College
St Dominic's Priory College, Adelaide
St Leonard's College (Melbourne)
St Paul's Grammar School
St Peter's Collegiate Girls' School
St Peters Lutheran College
Tara Anglican School for Girls
The Armidale School
Friends' School, Hobart
The Hills Grammar School
Illawarra Grammar School
Kilmore International School
The King's School, Parramatta
Tintern Grammar
Trinity Grammar School Preparatory School
Trinity Grammar School (New South Wales)
Trinity Lutheran College (Queensland)
Walford Anglican School for Girls
Wesley College (Victoria)
Woodcroft College
Xavier College

New Zealand
ACG Senior College
Auckland International College
Bay of Islands International Academy
Chilton Saint James School
Diocesan School for Girls, Auckland
John McGlashan College
Kristin School
Queen Margaret College, Wellington
Rangitoto College
Saint Kentigern College
Scots College, Wellington
Selwyn House School
St Cuthbert's College, Auckland
St Margaret's College, Christchurch
St Margaret's College, Otago
St Mark's Church School
St Peter's School, Cambridge
Takapuna Grammar School

Europe

Austria
Schloss Krumbach International School
Graz International Bilingual School (GIBS)
St. Gilgen International School (STGIS)
Vienna International School (VIS)
Danube International School
Linz International School Auhof

Belgium
International School of Brussels (ISB)
St. John's International School (Belgium)

Bosnia and Herzegovina
United World College in Mostar

Czech Republic
Carlsbad International School
English College Prague (ECP)
The English International School Prague (EISP)
International School of Ostrava
International School of Prague (ISP)
Prague British School (PBS)
Riverside School Prague

Denmark
Copenhagen International School (CIS)
Grenaa Gymnasium & HF
Herlufsholm School
Kolding Gymnasium
Langkaer Gymnasium
Nørre Gymnasium
Østerbro International School (ØIS)

France
American School of Paris (ASP)
International Bilingual School of Provence (IBS)
International School of Paris (ISP)
École Jeannine Manuel (EJM)

Germany
Bavarian International School (BIS)
Berlin Metropolitan School (ISS)
Frankfurt International School (FIS)
Helene-Lange-Gymnasium
International School of Düsseldorf (ISD)
International School of Hamburg (ISH)
International School Hannover Region (ISHR)
International School of Stuttgart (ISS)
Munich International School (MIS)
St. George's School, Cologne
Robert Bosch United World College, Freiburg
Dresden International School (DIS)

Greece
Anatolia College
Moraitis School, Athens
St. Catherine's British School, Athens

Italy
American Overseas School of Rome
American School of Milan
The British School of Milan
Deledda International School
The English International School of Padua
International School in Genoa
International School of Milan
Marymount International School of Rome
Rome International School
St. Stephen's School Rome
United World College of the Adriatic

Latvia
International School of Latvia

Netherlands
American School of The Hague
British School in the Netherlands
International School of The Hague
Rotterdam International Secondary School
United World College Maastricht

Norway
Bergen Cathedral School
Kristiansand Cathedral School
Oslo International School
Red Cross Nordic United World College
Skagerak International School
Trondheim International School
International School of Stavanger

Poland
American School of Warsaw
The British School Warsaw

Portugal
Carlucci American International School of Lisbon
Colégio Planalto
Oeiras International School
Oporto British School
Saint Dominic's International School
St. Julian's School

Romania
American International School of Bucharest

Russia
Anglo-American School of Moscow
British International School (Moscow)

Slovakia
Gymnasium Jur Hronec
The British International School Bratislava

Spain
International College Spain

Sweden
Grennaskolan
International School of the Gothenburg Region
Katedralskolan, Linköping
Katedralskolan, Skara
Katedralskolan, Uppsala
Katedralskolan, Växjö
Malmö Borgarskola
Sigtunaskolan Humanistiska Läroverket
Stockholm International School

Switzerland
American School in Switzerland
Collège Alpin International Beau Soleil
Collège Champittet, Pully
Collège du Léman
GEMS World Academy
Haut-Lac International Bilingual School
Inter-Community School Zürich
International School Basel
International School of Geneva
International School of Lausanne
International School of Zug and Luzern
La Côte International School
Realgymnasium Rämibühl
Literargymnasium Rämibühl

Ukraine
Kyiv International School
Pechersk School International

United Kingdom
The Abbey School, Reading
Anglo European School
Bedford School
Bexley Grammar School
Brentwood School, Essex
Charterhouse School
Colchester Sixth Form College
Dane Court Grammar School, Kent
Dartford Grammar School
EF Academy Oxford
EF Academy Torbay
Exeter College, Exeter
Fettes College
German School London
Godolphin and Latymer School
Gresham's School
Hautlieu School, Jersey
Hockerill Anglo-European College
Kent College, Canterbury
King's College School, Wimbledon
Malvern College
Marymount International School London
North London Collegiate School
Oakham School
Rochester Grammar School, Kent
Sevenoaks School, Kent
Sherborne School for Girls
St Benedict's Catholic High School, Alcester
Tonbridge Grammar School, Kent
Torquay Boys' Grammar School
United World College of the Atlantic

North America

Bahamas
Lyford Cay International School
St Andrews School

Barbados
Codrington School

Canada
Academie Ste Cecile International School
Ancaster High School
Ashbury College
Assumption College Catholic High School
Balmoral Hall School
Bayview Secondary School
Bermuda High School
Bishop Macdonell Catholic High School
Branksome Hall
Brockville Collegiate Institute
Cameron Heights Collegiate Institute
Cardinal Carter Catholic High School
Chippewa Secondary School
Cobourg Collegiate Institute
Colonel By Secondary School
Glenforest Secondary School
Glenview Park Secondary School
Harold M. Brathwaite Secondary School
Harry Ainlay High School
Henry Wise Wood Senior High School
John G. Diefenbaker High School
Kingston Collegiate and Vocational Institute
Lester B. Pearson High School (Calgary)
Lillian Osborne High School
Luther College High School
McNally High School
M.E. LaZerte High School
Monarch Park Collegiate Institute
Mulgrave School
Nicholson Catholic College
Notre Dame Catholic Secondary School (Brampton)
Old Scona Academic High School
Park View Education Centre
Pearson College UWC (Lester B. Pearson United College of the Pacific)
Port Moody Secondary School
Richmond Secondary School
Regiopolis-Notre Dame Catholic Secondary School
Saint John High School
Sir Winston Churchill High School
Sir Winston Churchill Secondary School (Vancouver)
St. Robert Catholic High School
St. Thomas Aquinas Catholic
Stratford Hall
Strathcona-Tweedsmuir School
TMS School
Turner Fenton Secondary School
Upper Canada College
Victoria Park Collegiate Institute (Toronto)
Westdale Secondary School
Western Canada High School
Weston Collegiate Institute
White Oaks Secondary School
Wilmington Friends School
York School

Jamaica
American International School of Kingston (Kingston, Jamaica)

Mexico
Cetys Universidad
Colegio Americano de Puebla
Escuela Preparatoria Federal Lázaro Cárdenas
Greengates School
Tec de Monterrey
Universidad Regiomontana
Universidad de Monterrey
Centro de Investigación y Desarrollo de Educación Bilingüe

United States
Allen D. Nease High School
Allen High School (Texas)
Andress High School
Andrew Hill High School
Annapolis High School (Maryland)
Annie Wright Schools
Atherton High School, Louisville
Atlee High School
Awty International School
Barack Obama Academy of International Studies 6-12
Bethesda-Chevy Chase High School
Biotechnology High School
Bountiful High School
British International School of Boston
British International School of Chicago Lincoln Park
British International School of Chicago, South Loop
British International School of Houston
British International School of Washington
Brooke Point High School (Virginia)
Brooklyn Center High School (Brooklyn Center, Minnesota)
Brooklyn Latin School (Brooklyn, New York)
C. Leon King High School
Campbell High School (Georgia)
Canyon Springs High School (Moreno Valley, California)
Cape Coral High School
Carmel High School (Indiana)
Carrollton School of the Sacred Heart Miami, Florida
Central High School (Macon, Georgia)
Central High School (Springfield, Missouri)
City Honors School
Clarke County High School (Berryville, Virginia)
Clearfield High School
Cleveland High School (Portland, Oregon)
Connecticut IB Academy
Coppell High School
Coral Gables Senior High School Miami, FL
Coral Reef Senior High School
Corcoran High School
Coronado High School (El Paso, Texas)
Cypress Creek High School (Orlando, Florida)
Deerfield Beach High School
DeLand High School
Del Mar High School
Desert Mountain High School
Dobbs Ferry High School
Douglas County High School (Castle Rock, Colorado)
Dunbar High School (Fort Myers, Florida)
Eastside High School (Gainesville, Florida)
Edgewood High School (Edgewood, Maryland)
EF Academy New York
Edison High School (Minnesota) (Minneapolis)
Fairmont Preparatory Academy
Falls Church City Public Schools
Fort Myers Senior High School
Fresno High School
Garland High School
Gateway High School (Florida)
GEMS World Academy (Chicago)
George C. Marshall High School (Falls Church, Virginia)
George Mason High School (Falls Church, Virginia)
George Washington High School (Chicago)
Germantown High School (Tennessee)
Granada Hills Charter High School
Grand Rapids High School (Grand Rapids, Minnesota)
Great Oak High School (Temecula, California)
Great River Charter Montessori School (St. Paul, Minnesota)
Greeley West High School (Greeley, Colorado)
Grimsley High School
Harding Senior High School (Saint Paul, Minnesota)
Haines City High School
Henrico High School
Henry Foss High School
Highland High School (Utah)
Highland Park High School (Minnesota) (St. Paul, Minnesota)
Hilton Head Island High School
Hillcrest High School (Midvale, Utah)
Hillsborough High School (Tampa, Florida)
Huron High School (Ann Arbor, Michigan)
Inglemoor High School
Interlake High School
International Academy (Bloomfield Hills, Michigan)
International High School of San Francisco
The International School Portland, Oregon
International School of Indiana
Jim Hill High School (Jackson, Mississippi)
John Adams High School (Indiana)
John Dickinson High School (Wilmington, Delaware)
John Randolph Tucker High School
Johnson High School (Gainesville, Georgia)
Klein Oak High School
Lake Wales High School (Lake Wales, Florida)
Lamar High School (Houston)
Lawrence D. Bell High School (Hurst, Texas)
Léman Manhattan Preparatory School
Lexington High School (South Carolina)
Lincoln High School (Portland, Oregon)
Littleton High School (Colorado)
Long Beach High School (New York)
Long Trail School (Dorset, Vermont)
Longview High School (Longview, Texas)
Loveland High School (Colorado)
Meade Senior High School
Millard North High School (Omaha, Nebraska)
Millbrook High School (Raleigh, North Carolina)
Mira Loma High School
Mission Bay Senior High School
Morris Knolls High School (Rockaway, New Jersey)
Newbury Park High School
North Broward Preparatory School
North Central High School (Indianapolis)
North High School (Phoenix, Arizona)
North Kansas City High School
Ogden High School
Old Mill High School
Omaha Central High School
Oregon Trail Academy
Palisade High School (Mesa County, Colorado)
Patrick Henry High School (Minneapolis)
Pensacola High School
Plano East Senior High School
Pioneer Valley Chinese Immersion Charter School
Princess Anne High School
The Prout School
Richard Montgomery High School
Riverdale High School (Fort Myers, Florida)
Ronald Wilson Reagan College Preparatory High School
Roosevelt High School (Minneapolis)
Rufus King International School – High School Campus
Rutherford High School (Florida)
Saint Edward High School (Lakewood, Ohio)
San Jose High School
Saint George's School (Spokane, Washington)
Saint John's Preparatory School
Saint Paul Central High School (St. Paul, Minnesota)
Saint Petersburg High School (St. Petersburg, Florida)
Shiloh High School
Skyline High School (Utah)
Skyline High School (Washington)
Smoky Hill High School
Snowden International School
Sonora High School (La Habra, California)
South Charleston High School
South Fork High School
South Shore International College Preparatory High School
Southside High School (Greenville, South Carolina)
Southwest High School (Minneapolis)
Spruce Creek High School (Port Orange, Florida)
Stony Point High School
Strawberry Crest High School
Sturgis Charter Public School
Sunset High School (Beaverton, Oregon)
Temple High School (Temple, Texas)
Trinity High School (Euless, Texas)
Troy High School (Fullerton, California)
Tualatin High School
United World College of the American West, Montezuma, New Mexico
Valencia High School (Placentia, California)
Valdosta High School (Valdosta, Georgia)
Valley High School (Winchester, Nevada)
The Village School (Houston, Texas)
Walnut High School (Walnut, California)
Washburn High School (Minneapolis, Minnesota)
Wausau East High School (Wausau, Wisconsin)
West High School (Salt Lake City, Utah)
West Morris Central High School (Chester, New Jersey)
West Morris Mendham High School (Mendham, New Jersey)
Westwood High School (Austin, Texas) (Austin, Texas)
Whitby School (Greenwich, Connecticut, USA)
Wichita East High School (Wichita, Kansas)
William G. Enloe High School (Raleigh, North Carolina)
William Howard Taft High School (Chicago)
William T. Dwyer High School (Palm Beach Gardens, Florida)
Wilson Magnet High School
Windermere Preparatory School
Yonkers High School (Yonkers, New York)
York High School (Virginia)

Central/South America

Argentina
Asociación Escuelas Lincoln (Buenos Aires)
St. George's College (Quilmes)
Washington School (Buenos Aires)

Brazil
American School of Rio de Janeiro
American School of Brasilia
Associação Escola Graduada de São Paulo
Colégio Miguel de Cervantes (São Paulo)
Escola Maria Imaculada (Chapel School) (São Paulo)
International School of Curitiba (Curitiba)
Pan American School of Porto Alegre (Porto Alegre)
St. Francis College (São Paulo)

Chile
International School Nido de Aguilas (Santiago)
Santiago College

Colombia
Anglo Colombian School (Bogotá)
Colegio Albania (La Guajira Department)
The English School
Knightsbridge Schools International Bogotá (Bogotá)

Costa Rica
British School of Costa Rica
United World College of Costa Rica

Ecuador
Academia Cotopaxi
Colegio Americano de Quito
ÏSM International Academy
ISM Academy Quito

El Salvador
Academia Británica Cuscatleca

Nicaragua
Colegio Alemán Nicaragüense

Panama
International School of Panama
Knightsbridge Schools International Panama
Metropolitan School of Panama

Perú
Markham College
Newton College

Venezuela
British School, Caracas

References

International Baccalaureate schools